SID1 transmembrane family member 2 is a protein that in humans is encoded by the SIDT2 gene.

References

Further reading 

Human proteins